Branko Milovanović (Serbian Cyrillic: Бранко Миловановић; born 13 January 1973) is a Serbian former professional footballer who played as an attacking midfielder.

In his homeland, Milovanović represented OFK Beograd, Milicionar, and Vojvodina. He also played in the top leagues of Spain, Portugal, Greece, and Belgium.

External links
 AEK profile
 
 
 
 

AEK Athens F.C. players
Association football midfielders
Belgian Pro League players
Deportivo de La Coruña players
Ethnikos Asteras F.C. players
Expatriate footballers in Belgium
Expatriate footballers in Greece
Expatriate footballers in Portugal
Expatriate footballers in Spain
First League of Serbia and Montenegro players
FK Milicionar players
FK Vojvodina players
La Liga players
OFK Beograd players
People from Osečina
Primeira Liga players
R. Charleroi S.C. players
Serbia and Montenegro expatriate footballers
Serbia and Montenegro footballers
Serbia and Montenegro expatriate sportspeople in Belgium
Serbia and Montenegro expatriate sportspeople in Greece
Serbia and Montenegro expatriate sportspeople in Spain
Serbian footballers
Super League Greece players
Vitória S.C. players
Yugoslav First League players
1973 births
Living people
Serbian expatriate sportspeople in Portugal